The Grand Seduction is a 2013 Canadian comedy film directed by Don McKellar and written by Ken Scott and Michael Dowse. The film stars Taylor Kitsch, Brendan Gleeson, Liane Balaban and Gordon Pinsent. It is based on a 2003 French-Canadian film, La Grande Séduction.

The film was nominated in four categories for the Canadian Screen Awards, with Pinsent winning the award for Actor in a Supporting Role at the March 2014 ceremony.

Plot 
It begins with young boy, Murray French, narrating the story about his father, a fisherman in the small community of Tickle Head, Newfoundland and Labrador. Murray feels the community has a shared sense of purpose, good work ethics, and notes his parents' domestic bliss.

Many years later, the men of Tickle Head (including Murray) line up at the town's post office to receive welfare cheques from post office clerk, Kathleen, and cash them with bank branch manager, Henry Tilley. Adding to the indignity, Murray's wife is leaving him for a job in St. John's.

At a town meeting, the mayor tells Murray a petrochemical company is negotiating to build a factory in the town. The company requires a doctor to be a resident of the town, and the community has been trying unsuccessfully to find one for the last eight years. Murray resolves that a factory is what the town needs, and a resident doctor is the solution. Later, Murray observes the mayor surreptitiously leaving town with his family for a job in St. John's, as well.

In St. John's, Dr. Paul Lewis, a plastic surgeon, is flying home when a security agent finds cocaine in his luggage. The agent, the former mayor of Tickle Head, makes a deal with Dr. Lewis. In exchange for overlooking his possession of cocaine, Dr. Lewis agrees to live in Tickle Head for one month. Murray arranges for the "seduction" of Dr. Lewis to a long-term contract, lying to the townspeople this will guarantee the choice of Tickle Head as the location for the new factory. As part of the ruse, he convinces the townspeople to pretend to play cricket, the doctor's favourite sport, and also he taps the doctor's phone to learn more ways to entice him to stay.

The petrochemical company executive visits the town and tells Murray, who posing as the mayor, the rival town of St. Anne has made a more attractive offer, including a bribe. The executive demands a bribe of $100,000 before the plant will be awarded to Tickle Head, as well as, expressing concern about the population in Tickle Head is too small for a factory.

Murray goes to bank to apply for a loan. Henry denies the loan. But, Murray presses the issue, and tells Henry that he could be easily be replaced by an ATM. Henry reconsiders the loan against bank instructions knowing that he will be fired.

Meanwhile, the town's deception and favourable attention persuades Lewis to stay, helped by the discovery that his fiancée, Helen, has been cheating on him with his best friend. But when he accepts the position in front of the whole town, in a speech praising their authenticity and integrity, Murray shamefully lies and tells him that another doctor has already accepted the position. Afterwards, Kathleen tells Dr. Lewis the truth, causing him to  confront Murray angrily just as the executive is signing the paperwork for the factory. After an impassioned speech by Murray, Dr. Lewis agrees to stay. The company agrees to build the factory.

Later, the factory has opened, bringing dignity back to the town again. Murray reunites with his wife, and Henry has a new job, since he has been replaced with an ATM. The film ends with a satisfied ending similar to Murray's opening flashback.

Cast 
 Taylor Kitsch as Dr. Paul Lewis
 Brendan Gleeson as Murray French
 Liane Balaban as Kathleen
 Gordon Pinsent as Simon
 Mark Critch as Henry Tilley
 Peter Keleghan as Oil Executive
 Cathy Jones as Barbara French
 Mary Walsh as Vera
 Matt Watts as Frank Dalton
 Anna Hopkins as Helen (voice)
 Rhonda Rodgers as Samantha
 Lawrence Barry as Mayor Tom Fitzpatrick
 Percy Hynes White as Young Murray
 Sara Tilley as Miriam Mahoney

Production 
The Grand Seduction is based on the 2003 film Seducing Doctor Lewis (original French title La grande séduction). Shortly after it came out at Sundance Film Festival, an English-speaking version of the film was recommended. South Korea, Spain and Canada were all interested in doing a remake but only Canada, France and Italy ultimately developed remakes. Initially, Michael Dowse was to direct the film but he dropped out due to "artistic differences" with producer Roger Frappier. Ken Scott, who wrote the original script, was then attached at the direction of the film. He and Frappier planned the remake to be 80 per cent the same as the original. The film was expected to start shooting on 28 August 2011, but it got delayed. In April 2012, Scott left the project to focus on the remaking of his Starbuck film. In May 2012, Don McKellar came on board as director.

In 2011, there had been talks to have Robin Williams in the film but scheduling conflicts got in the way. Taylor Kitsch's and Brendan Gleeson's participation was confirmed in July 2012. Set in the fictional harbour of Tickle Head, principal photography started on 30 July 2012 in St. John's, Newfoundland and Labrador. The film was also shot in Red Cliffe, Bonavista Bay and in Trinity Bay, Newfoundland and Labrador. Filming wrapped in September 2012.

Release 

The film was premiered at the 2013 Toronto International Film Festival (TIFF). It was also selected as the opening film of the Atlantic Film Festival and the Calgary International Film Festival.

Upon the screening at TIFF, The Hollywood Reporter John DeFore described the film as a "charming, wholly commercial little comedy" that is "formulaic but pleasing", and praised Gleeson's performance. In her overview of the films shown at TIFF, Monika Bartyzel of The Week wrote: "The Grand Seduction is a super-sweet community tale sparked by the inclusion of McKellar's wry humor. It's a film overflowing with charm from end to end."

Home media
The Grand Seduction was released on Blu-ray on 16 September 2014  and DVD on 7 October 2014.

Reception 

Overall critical reception to the film has been mixed. On the review aggregator website Rotten Tomatoes, the film has an approval rating of 61% based on reviews from 71 critics. The website's consensus reads, "The Grand Seduction can't quite live up to the classic dramedies it seems to consciously evoke, but ambles sweetly enough to charm viewers in its own right." On Metacritic, the film has a weighted average score of 57/100, indicating mixed or average reviews, based on 20 critical reviews.

Box office
In its opening weekend, the film grossed $323,743 in 94 theatres in the United States, ranking #17 at the box office. By the end of its run, The Grand Seduction grossed $3,878,262.

Awards and accolades

References

External links 
 
 
 

2013 films
2013 comedy films
Canadian comedy films
Remakes of Canadian films
English-language Canadian films
Films directed by Don McKellar
Films set in Newfoundland and Labrador
Films shot in Newfoundland and Labrador
Entertainment One films
2010s English-language films
2010s Canadian films